Garra gracilis is a species of ray-finned fish in the genus Garra.

References 

Garra
Taxa named by Jacques Pellegrin
Taxa named by Pierre Chevey
Fish described in 1936